Beatriz Gómez Cortés (born 29 December 1994 in Pontevedra, Spain) is a Spanish olympic swimmer. She swam at the 2012 Summer Olympics in the 200 m individual medley. Gómez won a gold medal in the 200m IM at the 2011 FINA World Junior Swimming Championships and won silver medals at the 2010 European Junior Swimming Championships in the 200m IM and 400m IM.

References 

1994 births
Living people
Olympic swimmers of Spain
Swimmers at the 2012 Summer Olympics
Swimmers at the 2018 Mediterranean Games
Spanish female medley swimmers
Mediterranean Games competitors for Spain
21st-century Spanish women